The R489 road is a regional road in Ireland linking the N52 at Riverstown, County Tipperary with the N65 east of Portumna bridge.

See also
Roads in Ireland
National primary road
National secondary road

References
Roads Act 1993 (Classification of Regional Roads) Order 2006 – Department of Transport

Regional roads in the Republic of Ireland
Roads in County Tipperary